The 1962 European Aquatics Championships were held in Leipzig, East Germany from 18 to 25 August 1962. Titles were contested in swimming, diving and water polo (men). In the men's swimming program, the 100 m backstroke had been replaced by the 200 m backstroke. Furthermore, the 400 m individual medley and the 4 × 100 m freestyle relay were introduced. In women's swimming, the 400 m individual medley was introduced.

Medal table

Medal summary

Diving
Men's events

Women's events

Swimming

Men's events

Women's events

Water polo

See also
List of European Championships records in swimming

References

European Championships
European Aquatics Championships
LEN European Aquatics Championships
International sports competitions hosted by East Germany
European Aquatics
1962 in German sport
International aquatics competitions hosted by Germany
August 1962 sports events in Europe